This is a list of open-pit mines.

Argentina
 Cerro Vanguardia Mine – gold and silver mine located near Puerto San Julián, Santa Cruz
 Pascua Lama – binational gold and silver mine in San Juan, Argentina and Atacama, Chile (in project)

Australia
 Boddington Gold Mine – gold and copper mine near Boddington, Western Australia
 Cadia Mine – gold and copper mine located near Orange, New South Wales
 Challenger Mine – gold mine near Coober Pedy, South Australia
 Hazelwood Mine – brown-coal mine near Morwell, Victoria
 Hunter Valley Operations – metallurgic and thermal coal mine near Singleton, New South Wales
 Loy Yang Mine – brown-coal mine near Traralgon, Victoria
 McArthur River Mine – zinc, lead and silver mine southwest of Borroloola, Northern Territory
 Prominent Hill mine – copper mine near Coober Pedy, South Australia
 Ranger Mine – uranium mine east of Darwin, Northern Territory
 Sunrise Dam gold mine – gold mine near Laverton, Western Australia
 Super Pit – gold mine near Kalgoorlie, Western Australia
 Telfer Mine – gold and copper mine in the Pilbara, Western Australia
 Peak Downs Mine – coking coal mine near Moranbah, Queensland
 Goonyella Riverside Mine – metallurgical coking coal near Moranbah, Queensland
 Yallourn Mine – brown-coal mine near Morwell, Victoria

Botswana
 Jwaneng diamond mine
 Orapa diamond mine
 Damtshaa diamond mine
 Letlhakane diamond mine

Bulgaria
 Maritsa Iztok Mines – coal mine near Radnevo, Stara Zagora Province, Bulgaria

Canada

 Adams Mine – abandoned mine in Kirkland Lake, Ontario
 Athabasca oil sands – second largest proven petroleum reserve in the world as of 2013, located in northern Alberta along the Athabasca river.
 Barkerville Mine - Gold Mine near Wells, British Columbia
 Colomac Mine – gold mine in Northwest Territories
 Copperfields Mine, an abandoned base and precious metal mine in Temagami, Ontario
 Copper Mountain Mine – Copper mine South of Princeton, British Columbia
 Detour Lake Gold Mine - Gold mine in Cochrane, Ontario
 Diavik Diamond Mine – diamond mine in Northwest Territories
 Ekati Diamond Mine – diamond mine in Northwest Territories
 Elkview Operations – Coal mine in the Elk Valley of British Columbia
 Endako Mine – a molybdenum mine in the Nechako Region of British Columbia, 72 km W of Vanderhoof, BC
 Fording River – Coal mine in the Elk Valley of British Columbia
 Gibraltar Mine copper mine near Williams Lake, British Columbia
 Greenhills - Coal Mine in the Elk Valley of British Columbia
 Highland Valley Copper – copper mine in British Columbia
 Huckleberry Mine – a copper/molybdenum/gold/silver mine in the Nechako Region of British Columbia  87 km SSW of Houston, BC
 Kanichee Mine, an abandoned base and precious metal mine in Temagami, Ontario
 Line Creek – Coal Mine in the Elk Valley of British Columbia
 Mary River Mine – Iron mine in the Mary River region of Baffin Island, Nunavut
 Mount Milligan – Copper/Gold Mine west of Mackenzie, British Columbia
 Mount Polly – Copper mine near Quesnel, British Columbia
 Pine Point Mine – lead and zinc mine in Northwest Territories
 Red Chris Mine - Copper/Gold Mine 80km South of Dease Lake, British Columbia
 Sherman Mine – abandoned iron mine in Temagami, Ontario
 Silver Hope Mine – a silver/gold/copper mine in the Nechako Region of British Columbia, 40 km SE of Houston, British Columbia
 Canadian Malartic Gold mine (Largest in Canada)

Chile
 Chuquicamata – copper mine
 Escondida – copper mine
 Pascua Lama – binational gold and silver mine in San Juan, Argentina and Atacama, Chile (in project)
 Radomiro Tomic – copper mine
 Pelambres – copper mine
 El Salvador – copper mine
 Andina – copper mine
 Antucoya – copper mine
 El Soldado – mine
 Los Bronces – copper mine
 Gabriela Mistral – copper mine
 Cerro Negro – copper mine
 Esperanza – copper mine
 Collahuasi – copper mine

Colombia
 Cerrejón – coal mine in Guajira Department

Egypt
 Sukari – gold mine

Germany

 Tagebau Garzweiler – lignite mine
 Tagebau Hambach – lignite mine
 Tagebau Inden – lignite mine

India
 Hutti – gold mine in Raichur District of Karnataka
 Neyveli Lignite – largest open cast mines in India
Rampura Agucha Mines, Zinc mine in Rajasthan

Indonesia
 Batu Hijau mine – copper and gold mine on the island of Sumbawa
 Grasberg mine – largest gold and second largest copper mine in the world in Papua province

Iran
 Gol Gohar mine – the largest iron mine in Iran
 Sarcheshme Copper Mine – copper mine with side production of gold and molybdenum

Kyrgyzstan
 Kumtor Gold Mine – gold mine in Tian Shan Mountains at 4,000-4,400 m (14,000 ft) above sea level

Mongolia
 Boroo Gold Mine – gold mine 110 km (70 mi) WNW of the capital Ulan Bator

Namibia
 Rossing – uranium mine

New Zealand
 Macraes Mine – gold mine in Central Otago
 Martha Mine – gold mine in Waihi

Papua New Guinea
 Panguna mine – copper mine in Bougainville Province

Peru

 Toquepala – porphyry copper.
 Yanacocha – gold mine
 Cuajone Mine – porphyry copper.
 Antamina Mine – Polymetallic mine (Copper, Zinc)
 Antapacay Mine – copper.
 Cerro Verde Mine – porphyry copper.
 Toromocho Mine – copper and Moly.

Poland 
 Adamów Coal Mine – coal mine (lignite)
 Bełchatów Coal Mine – coal mine (lignite) 
 Konin Coal Mine – coal mine (lignite) 
 Turów Coal Mine – coal mine (lignite)

Portugal
 Sao Domingos Mine – copper mine

Romania
 Berbeşti Coal Mine – coal mine
 Motru Coal Mine – coal mine
 Roșia Poieni copper mine
 Rovinari Coal Mine – coal mine

Russia

 Mirny Mine – diamond mine in Mirny, Eastern Siberia
 Udachnaya pipe – diamond mine in Yakutia, Russia

South Africa
 The Big Hole – a former diamond mine in Kimberley, dug to 240 m (790 ft) between 1871 and 1914, making it the deepest hand-excavated pit in the world. Now a museum.
 The Jagersfontein Mine – operating between 1888 and 1971. This was hand-excavated to 201 m (660 ft) by 1911, and the hand-dug pit was sightly larger than the Big Hole.
 The Palabora Open Pit – mechanically excavated by Palabora Mining Company, in Phalaborwa, Limpopo Province. The pit is 898m deep and 1846m across on top.
 Voorspoed diamond mine

Serbia
 RB Kolubara – coal mine (lignite)
 Kostolac coal mine – coal mine (lignite)
 Bor mine – copper and gold
 Majdanpek mine – copper and gold

Spain
 Corta Atalaya – the largest open-pit mine in Europe and was at one time the largest in the world.
 Sierra Menera – Sistema Ibérico
  – second largest polymetallic sulphides deposit in Europe.

Sweden
 Aitik-gruvan in Gällivare – copper mine with side production of gold and molybdenum

United Kingdom
 Ffos-y-fran Land Reclamation Scheme – coal mine in Wales
 Penrhyn Quarry – slate quarry in Wales
 Minorca – coal mine near Swepstone and Measham Leicestershire
 Halton Lea Gate near Lambley, Northumberland – coal mine (given planning approval 2014)

United States

 Berkeley Pit – former copper mine in Butte, Montana; now the largest and most expensive Superfund site in history
 Bingham Canyon Mine – copper mine in Salt Lake County, Utah; largest man-made excavation on Earth; more commonly known as Kennecott Copper Mine
 Chino Mine – copper mine in Grant County, New Mexico
 Cresson Mine – gold mine in Victor, Colorado
 Fort Knox mine – gold mine in the Fairbanks mining district of Alaska
 Hull–Rust–Mahoning Open Pit Iron Mine – largest open pit iron mine in the world, near Hibbing, Minnesota
 Lavender Pit – copper mine in Cochise County, Arizona
 Morenci Mine – copper mine in Greenlee County, Arizona
 Mountain Iron Mine – iron mine in Mountain Iron, Minnesota
 Robinson Mine – copper and gold mine in Ruth, Nevada
 New Cornelia mine – inactive copper mine near Ajo, Arizona
 Ray mine – Asarco copper mine located in Pinal county, Arizona
 Red Dog mine – zinc and lead mine in Red Dog Mine, Alaska
 Rio Tinto Borax Mine – California's largest open-pit mine and the largest borax mine in the world
 Thompson Creek mine – molybdenum mine in Custer County, Idaho

Zambia
 Nchanga Open Pit Mine, Chingola – the second largest open cast mine in the world, covering nearly 30 km2 and up to 400m deep.
Area j open cast mine, kitwe, copper ores.

See also

References

o
Open-pit mines
Surface mining